Shepperton Road is a single carriageway four lane road in Perth, Western Australia. 

Counterintuitively, the road provides a higher-capacity alternative for the northernmost section of Albany Highway due to the latter forming the high street of the busy inner south-eastern suburb of Victoria Park. The road therefore forms the northernmost section of State Route 30, with the bypassed section of Albany Highway unsigned as a result.

History
Shepperton Road was noted as running parallel to the then-named Albany Road between Harvey Street,  from The Causeway, and Somerset Street,  further along. In 1937, a road from Asquith Street to Albany Road was constructed, to eventually link in with Shepperton Road. In the same year, the intersection of Albany Road, Milford Street, and Welshpool Road was reconfigured to improve visibility, and in anticipation of an eastern extension to Shepperton Road. In April 1940, that extension was nearing completion, which was expected to be by the end of May, while the demolition of houses on land resumed for the western extension was being arranged. On 29 September 1941, the Perth City Council decided to construct the link between Asquith Street and Harvey Street early the following year, completing the Shepperton Road bypass. Buses were rerouted onto Shepperton Road in 1946, by which time it had become the preferred route for motorists.

References

Roads in Perth, Western Australia